Rocco Perri (born Rocco Perre; December 30, 1887 – disappeared April 23, 1944) was an Italian-born organized crime figure in Hamilton, Ontario, Canada. He was one of the most prominent Prohibition-era crime figures in Canada, and was sometimes referred to as "King of the Bootleggers" and "Canada's Al Capone."

Born in the Italian town of Platì in Calabria, Perri immigrated to the United States, and later to Canada, in 1908. In the early 1910s, he started work in construction and in a bakery. Perri and his common-law wife, Bessie Starkman, began a business in bootlegging when the sale and distribution of alcohol was prohibited in both Canada and the United States. Starkman dealt mainly with the finances of the business.

In 1928, Perri was charged with perjury after a Royal Commission testimony, and served five months of a six month prison sentence. In 1930, Starkman was ambushed in her garage and killed; no one was charged with her murder. In 1940, Perri was arrested and sent to internment at Camp Petawawa as part of the Italian Canadian internment; he was released three years later. Perri disappeared in Hamilton on April 23, 1944, when he went for a walk; his body was never found, and this caused speculation surrounding his purported death.

Early and family life
Rocco Perri was born in Platì, Calabria, Italy, on December 30, 1887, and immigrated to the United States in 1903, then to Canada in 1908. In 1912, Perri met Bessie Starkman, a Polish Jew who had immigrated to Canada circa 1900, while he lived as a boarder in her family home in The Ward, Toronto, Ontario, with her husband Harry Toben and their two children. Shortly after, Perri began an affair with Starkman, and when he got a job working on the Welland Canal in 1913, she left her husband and children to move in with Perri in St. Catharines and begin a common-law relationship. 

When the Canadian government cut funding to the Welland Canal project due to World War I, Perri became unemployed. After working in a bakery, he was hired as a salesman for the Superior Macaroni Company. However, Perri and Starkman found a better means of income when the Ontario Temperance Act came into effect on September 16, 1916, as it restricted the sale and distribution of alcohol. The couple began bootlegging; using Starkman's business acumen and Perri's connections, they established a profitable enterprise. By this time the two lived in Hamilton, Ontario, and by 1920, moved into a larger home at 166 Bay Street South.

In 1918, Perri began an affair with Sarah Olive Routledge, with whom he had two daughters; Autumn (born in 1919), and Catherine (born in 1921). After Autumn was born, Perri had refused to marry Routledge, but he did maintain a home for her in St. Catharines and paid child support. Their affair resumed in 1920. Perri's job as a macaroni salesman required travel across Ontario; he also used those trips to arrange the sale of liquor. Starkman, busy running the finances for their organization, did not question Perri's outings. In February 1922, Routledge was falsely told by Perri's lawyer that he was already married to Starkman. Despondent, Routledge committed suicide by jumping from her lawyer's seventh-story office window of the Bank of Hamilton; her parents took custody of their children. In the 1930s, Perri asked to see his daughters on weekends, although their grandmother would always accompany them for fear that he would take them.

Starkman was the head of operations and the duo's negotiator and dealmaker, until August 13, 1930, when she was ambushed at around 11:15 p.m. as she got out of Perri's car in the garage of the couple's home. Perri ran down the street after the assailants before retreating back to Starkman, who had been killed with two shotgun blasts. Police found two double-barreled shotguns and the getaway car without fingerprints. The investigation eventually resulted in no criminal charges being brought despite a $5,000 reward offered by Perri. However, it was thought that Calabrian compatriot Antonio Papalia, leader of the Papalia crime family and father of Johnny Papalia, played a role in the murder.

On August 17, about 20,000 people lined the street for the funeral cortege of hundreds of vehicles; Perri fainted at the gravesite. Starkman's headstone in Hamilton's Ohev Zedek Cemetery, commissioned by Perri, referred to her as "Bessie Starkman – Perri", but the "Perri" part was later removed by persons unknown. Part of Starkman's estate went to Perri, and the rest to her children. By 1933, Perri was living with another woman, Annie Newman, who helped him to improve his criminal enterprise. The couple profited from enterprises such as bootlegging and drug trafficking. "Annie was just as corrupt and business-like as Bessie," according to one source. In 1943, Newman was imprisoned for smuggling gold.

Criminal operations
Perri and Starkman survived financially in the few years after 1915 from his income as a macaroni salesman and the grocery store on Hess Street. After the Ontario Temperance Act was passed in 1916, making the sale of alcohol illegal, the couple started selling shots of Canadian whisky on the side. Their bootlegging was done on a small scale, with their kitchen as the centre of operations.

Bootlegging became a larger and more profitable enterprise when Prohibition was declared in Canada nationwide on April 1, 1918, and the Eighteenth Amendment that prohibited sale of alcohol in the United States in 1920. Through the 1920s, Perri became the leading figure in organized crime in Southern Ontario and was under constant surveillance by police. The government allowed for numerous exceptions, allowing various breweries and distilleries to remain open for the export market. 

Perri specialized in exporting liquor from old Canadian distilleries, such as Seagram and Gooderham and Worts, to the U.S., and helped these companies obtain a large share of the American market — a share they kept after Prohibition ended in Ontario in 1927, and the United States in 1933. He has also been linked as a distributor of Canadian whisky to New York City's Frank Costello and Chicago's Al Capone, yet when Capone was asked if he knew Perri, he said "Why, I don't even know which street Canada is on." Other sources, however, claim that Capone had certainly visited Canada, where he maintained some hideaways, but the Royal Canadian Mounted Police states that there is no "evidence that he ever set foot on Canadian soil." Perri also sold trainloads of liquor into Chicago and Detroit through Niagara Falls and Windsor, Ontario. During Prohibition, "The authorities were quite happy to turn a blind eye to bootlegging, and also to take payoffs ... and Rocco had all the important police in Hamilton ... on his payroll" according to author Trevor Cole.

On May 10, 1922, the boss of the Scaroni crime family, Domenic Scaroni, was killed after being invited to a meeting of organized crime figures in Niagara Falls. His brother Joe Scaroni was killed on September 4, after being driven to a bakery by Perri associates John Trott and Antonio Deconza. Perri was linked to the murders, though no evidence was found. With the Scaroni brothers eliminated, Perri formed an allegiance with the Serianni crime family to keep the Ontario market out of the hands of the Magaddino crime family in Buffalo, New York. Perri soon diversified into gambling, extortion and prostitution. He and Starkman were also reported to have taken part in the narcotics trade as early as 1922, when the Royal Canadian Mounted Police (RCMP) suspected Perri of "dealing in narcotics on a large scale."

On November 19, 1924, in an exclusive interview with the Toronto Daily Star, he stated, "My men do not carry guns ... If I find that they do, I get rid of them. It is not necessary. I provide them with high-powered cars. That is enough. If they cannot run away from the police it is their fault. But guns make trouble. My men do not use them." He also did not view himself as a criminal, believing that that Prohibition was "a law that people did not want." 

Perri typically shipped his illegal alcohol into the U.S. overland, but also owned a boat for crossing Lake Ontario. He had a limited business relationship with bootlegger Ben Kerr, who also owned a home on Bay Street. Kerr was described by the some as "King of the Lake Ontario rum-runners" (smugglers who typically used boats). Kerr was operating within Perri's territory, but the latter required Kerr to smuggle raw American alcohol into Ontario, and may also have allowed Kerr to sell alcohol in a certain part of New York State in return for the payment of a commission. These ventures enabled Kerr to expand his operations and to remain a solid customer of distilleries such as Gooderham & Worts and Corby's. Kerr and his boat Pollywog disappeared in February 1929; weeks later, his body and some wreckage from his boat were found on the shore of Lake Ontario near Colborne. Based on his research, author C.W. Hunt theorized that Perri was likely responsible for Kerr's death, perhaps using his own, more effectively-armoured boat, the Uncas. Hunt conceded that there were two other possible causes: "misadventure" (a marine accident) as stated by the coroner, or an act by the Staud brothers with their well armed/armoured boat.  

One report estimates that in the mid-1920s, Perri and Starkman were generating C$1 million per year through criminal endeavours and had a hundred employees. In that era, Perri was a "big spender" and the couple lived an opulent lifestyle. Nonetheless, Perri paid only $13.30 in income tax based on employment as a macaroni salesman and his "export/mailorder" business in 1926; Starkman, who claimed to be supporting him, paid $96.43. At about that time, some reports indicated that she had between $500,000 and one million in deposits at various banks. That same year, Perri faced criminal charges in the death of 17 people who died after drinking illegal liquor, but was acquitted of the charges. 

In 1927, Perri was compelled to testify at the Royal Commission on Customs and Excise inquiry, focusing on bootlegging and smuggling, and also at a hearing on tax evasion charges against Gooderham and Worts. Later that year, at the Gooderham and Worts tax evasion hearing, Perri admitted to buying whisky from the distiller from 1924 to 1927. Gooderham and Worts was convicted of tax evasion in 1928 and ordered to pay a fine of $439,744. Perri and Starkman were charged with perjury after their Royal Commission testimony, but in a plea bargain, the charges were dropped against Starkman; Perri served five months of a six-month sentence and was released on September 27, 1928. On August 2, 1930, Perri and Mike Serge were charged with illegal possession of 10 gallons of liquor, but nine days later, both men were acquitted. Starkman was murdered on August 13, 1930.

Between 1937 and 1939, Perri owned a brewery on Fleet Street in Toronto. In 1938, two attempts were made to kill Perri: on March 20, his veranda was destroyed by dynamite that had been placed underneath it, and on November 23, a bomb under his car detonated. Perri was not injured in either attempt.

In 1940, Perri and his brother Mike were arrested and sent to internment at Camp Petawawa as part of the Italian Canadian internment, as potentially dangerous enemy aliens with alleged connections to Benito Mussolini's fascist regime; he was released on October 17, 1943. During this internment, Perri served some time with Antonio Papalia, who was released two years before Perri. Papalia then began to expand his enterprise with his son Johnny, who had some relationship with the Buffalo crime family.

Disappearance and aftermath
Rocco Perri was last seen alive in Hamilton on April 23, 1944, at the home of a cousin, Joe Serge, on Murray Street West. According to a Maclean's magazine report from June 15 of that year, Perri was then "working as a doorman in a Toronto theatre." Before lunch, he complained of a headache and went for a walk to clear his head but never returned. 

Perri's body has never been found, though it is speculated he was murdered by being fitted with cement shoes and thrown into Burlington Bay—a practice known colloquially as the lupara bianca. It is believed Antonio and Johnny Papalia, along with Stefano Magaddino of Buffalo, played a role in Perri's disappearance to gain better control of the Canadian alcohol market. The Royal Canadian Mounted Police concluded in 1954 that they "won't find his body until the Bay dries up." After Perri's disappearance, three of his former lieutenants, in addition to Papalia and Giacomo Luppino, began answering to Magaddino in Buffalo: Tony Sylvestro, Calogero Bordonaro and Santo Scibetta, known as the "three dons."

In 1992, evidence into Perri's disappearance was uncovered by Mafia expert Antonio Nicaso. A letter shared with him by Perri's cousin in Italy, dated June 10, 1949, and translated from Italian, read, "Dear cousin, With this letter, I will tell you I am in good health. Let them know I'm fine if you've heard the news." It is signed Rocco Perri. Perri's cousin also claims that the gangster died in 1953 in Massena, New York. In 2018, Perri's relatives from Hamilton and Australia, during an attempt to collect on the late mobster's estate, claimed that he had lived in Massena under the name Giuseppe Portolesi before dying of natural causes in 1953. The group's Andrew Monterosso said that he had made a good living through legal ventures such as the ownership of properties in the U.S. and in Mexico.

In 1998, a will and testament from 1930 surfaced; it was purported to be that of Perri, but there is doubt that he was ever declared dead. A CBC News report in 2012 stated that "there's no death certificate out there for Rocco Perri." The group attempting to access the mobster's estate said in 2018 that there was no social insurance number or death certificate, and that the Canada Revenue Agency had transferred the funds from Perri's estate to Italy in 2008.

In popular culture
In July 2014, the first performance of a one-woman play about Starkman's life, Bootlegger's Wife, was staged at Theatre Aquarius in Hamilton, Ontario. The creator and star was Victoria Murdoch; while the Perri character does not appear, "voiceovers" provide his comments. The play was staged again in mid-March 2019 and at intervals between those dates.

See also
 List of people who disappeared

References

Further reading
 "King of the Mob: Rocco Perri and the women who ran his rackets" by James Dubro and Robin Rowland (Toronto)-1987.
 Rocco Perri: The Story of Canada's Most Notorious Bootlegger by Antonio Nicaso. John Wiley and Sons, Toronto, 2004.
 Rocco Perri Scrapbook (Hamilton Herald Newspaper articles) 12 April 1927, 14, 16, 18 August 1930
 Hamilton Public Library clippings, Hamilton, Famous and Fascinating, Thomas Melville Bailey and Charles Ambrose Carter.
 Allen, Everett S. The black ships: Rumrunners of Prohibition. Little, Brown. 1979. .
 Carse, Robert. Rum row.
 Cohen, Daniel. Prohibition: America Makes Alcohol Illegal. Millbrook Press. 1995.
 Frew, David. Prohibition and Rum Running on Lake Erie (The Lake Erie Quadrangle Shipwreck Series, Book 4) Erie County Historical Society; 1ST edition (2006) .
 Gervais, Marty. The Rumrunners: A Prohibition Scrapbook. Biblioasis. 1980, Revised & Expanded 2009. .
 Hunt, C. W. Whisky and Ice: The Saga of Ben Kerr, Canada's Most Daring Rumrunner. Dundurn Press. 1995. .
 Mason, Philip P. Rumrunning and the Roaring Twenties: Prohibition on the Michigan-Ontario Waterway. Wayne State University Press, 1995.
 Miller, Don. I was a rum runner. Lescarbot Printing Ltd. 1979.
 Montague, Art. Canada's Rumrunners: Incredible Adventures And Exploits During Canada's Illicit Liquor Trade. Altitude Publishing Canada. 2004. .
 Moray, Alastair. The diary of a rum-runner. P. Allan & Co. Ltd. 1929, Reprint in 2006. 
 Steinke, Gord. Mobsters & Rumrunners Of Canada: Crossing The Line. Folklore Publishing. 2003. . .
 Willoughby, Malcolm F. Rum War at Sea. Fredonia Books. 2001. .
 Yandle, Bruce. Bootleggers and Baptists: The Education of a Regulatory Economist. Regulation 7, no. 3. 1983: 12.

1887 births
1940s missing person cases
20th-century Canadian criminals
Bootleggers
Canadian male criminals
Canadian gangsters of Italian descent
Depression-era gangsters
Italian emigrants to Canada
Italian emigrants to the United States
Missing gangsters
Missing person cases in Canada
People from Hamilton, Ontario
People from the Province of Reggio Calabria
Prohibition-era gangsters
Year of death unknown